Spækhugger (lit. Killer Whale) is a  sailboat class designed by Peter Bruun and built in about 500 copies.

History
The Spækhugger was designed in 1969 for cruising and racing and become the most popular boat in Denmark during the 1970s.

References

1960s sailboat type designs
Sailboat type designs by Danish designers
Sailboat types built in Denmark
Keelboats